Beloit Transit is the public transportation system in Beloit, Wisconsin. It is owned and operated by the city of Beloit.

History

Public transit in Beloit began in 1902 with interurbans serving the city. Proper streetcar service followed in 1906 run by the Beloit Traction Company. Buses replaced streetcar service on August 12, 1930, and privately operated buses continued to ply Beloit's streets until April 1, 1972, when the city took over operations. In 1977, service expanded to South Beloit, Illinois.

New automated fareboxes were rolled out in 2020, followed by a new route on the east side of Beloit in 2021. Free fares were offered for one week to raise awareness of the route change. In June 2022, Beloit Transit purchased its first hybrid bus, replacing a 15 year old diesel bus. The new bus was primarily funded by a federal grant and is expected to enter the fleet in 2023. The hybrid bus will allow Beloit Transit to save $1,100 per year in diesel costs and reduce greenhouse gas emissions by 18 tons.

Services
The transit system operates seven routes including the Beloit-Janesville Express, which connects with the Janesville Transit System.  Service is only provided Monday through Friday from 5:29am to 6:22pm. The downtown transfer facility is located at 225 Shirland Ave. All routes except Route 4 operate from the transfer facility. In September 2020, the council approved changes to the transit system that boosted coverage of the city's population and employment destinations to 86%, up from 70% coverage while also bolstering coverage to Beloit business destinations from 53% to 66% for employees without personal transportation.

Route 1: Serves northwest Beloit, including the Transfer Center, and Woodman's Transfer Point
Route 2: Serves northeast Beloit, including the Transfer Center, and Piggly Wiggly Transfer Point
Route 3: Serves eastern Beloit, including the Transfer Center, and Piggly Wiggly Transfer Point
Route 4: Serves northern Beloit, including the Piggly Wiggly Transfer Point
Route 5: Serves eastern Beloit, and South Beloit, IL, including the Transfer Center
Route 6: Serves northern Beloit, including the Transfer Center, and Piggly Wiggly Transfer Point
BJE: Beloit Janesville Express, connects with Janesville Transit System

Beloit Transfer Center

In 2005, the Beloit Transfer Center was re-located from the Beloit Mall to the corner of Broad St and Pleasant St. A permanent transfer facility was built in 2009 south of downtown Beloit near the corner of Shirland Ave and Mill St, next to the Beloit City Hall. In addition to serving as the hub for local and express bus service, the Beloit Transfer Center includes public restrooms, indoor waiting area, driver break room, and a customer service room. Due to its location on the south end of town, BTS bus routes must travel up to an additional 5 minutes than if the center were more centrally located.

Ridership

See also
 List of bus transit systems in the United States
 List of intercity bus stops in Wisconsin
 Janesville Transit System

References

External links
https://www.beloittransit.com/

Beloit, Wisconsin
Bus transportation in Wisconsin
Bus transportation in Illinois